Second Hand Heart is the 19th studio album by American country music artist Dwight Yoakam. It was released on April 14, 2015 via Warner Bros. Records.

Reception
The album sold 21,000 copies in its first week of release, debuting at number 2 on the Billboard Top Country Albums chart and becoming Yoakam's highest-charting album since Buenas Noches from a Lonely Room in 1988.  The album has sold 87,000 copies in the US as of August 2016.

Track listing

Personnel
 Jonathan Clark - bass guitar, baritone guitar, background vocals
 Eugene Edwards - electric guitar, electric sitar, background vocals
 Mitch Marine - drums, percussion
 Brian Whelan - electric guitar, tremolo guitar, harmonica, mandolin, organ, pedal steel guitar, piano, background vocals
 Dwight Yoakam - acoustic guitar, electric guitar, tambourine, lead vocals, background vocals

Chart performance

Weekly charts

Year-end charts

References

2015 albums
Dwight Yoakam albums
Warner Records albums
Albums produced by Chris Lord-Alge